Tofisopam (Emandaxin, Grandaxin, Sériel) is an anxiolytic that is marketed in several European countries. Chemically, it is a 2,3-benzodiazepine. Unlike other anxiolytic benzodiazepines (which are generally 1,4- or 1,5-substituted) however, tofisopam does not have anticonvulsant, sedative, skeletal muscle relaxant, motor skill-impairing or amnestic properties. While it may not be an anticonvulsant in and of itself, it has been shown to enhance the anticonvulsant action of classical 1,4-benzodiazepines (such as diazepam) and muscimol, but not sodium valproate, carbamazepine, phenobarbital, or phenytoin. Tofisopam is indicated for the treatment of anxiety and alcohol withdrawal, and is prescribed in a dosage of 50–300 mg per day divided into three doses. Peak plasma levels are attained two hours after an oral dose. Tofisopam is not reported as causing dependence to the same extent as other benzodiazepines, but is still recommended to be prescribed for a maximum of 12 weeks.

Tofisopam is not approved for sale in the United States or Canada. However, Vela Pharmaceuticals of New Jersey is developing the D-enantiomer (dextofisopam) as a treatment for irritable bowel syndrome, with moderate efficacy demonstrated in clinical trials so far.

Tofisopam is also claimed to be a PDE10A inhibitor, which may provide an alternative mechanism of action for its various therapeutic effects, and this action has been proposed to make tofisopam potentially useful as a treatment for schizophrenia.

Tofisopam has been shown to act as an inhibitor of the liver enzyme CYP3A4, and some researches suspect that this could cause dangerous drug interactions with other medications metabolised by this enzyme, although the clinical significance of these findings remains unclear.

References

External links 
 Inchem.org - Tofisopam

Anxiolytics
Benzodiazepines
CYP3A4 inhibitors
Phosphodiesterase inhibitors
Phenol ethers